John Andersson Klingberg (born 14 August 1992) is a Swedish professional ice hockey defenceman for the Minnesota Wild of the National Hockey League (NHL). He was drafted 131st overall in the 2010 NHL Entry Draft by the Dallas Stars. He is the younger brother of Carl Klingberg.

Playing career
Klingberg started his career at an early age in Lerums BK; he was then signed as a youth to join the Frölunda HC program. He made his Elitserien debut for Frölunda HC on 21 September 2010, against AIK.

On 16 May 2011, the Dallas Stars announced that they had signed Klingberg to a three-year entry level contract. He was then loaned to the Finnish SM-liiga to play with Jokerit in the 2011–12 season before returning to Sweden midway through the campaign to Skellefteå AIK.

In the 2013–14 season, Klingberg opted to play on loan with Frölunda HC, and produced a career high 11 goals and 28 points in 50 games. After post-season elimination, Klingberg was assigned to the Stars' American Hockey League (AHL) affiliate, the Texas Stars, and played in three regular season games.

In his first full North American season in 2014–15, Klingberg remained with Texas to begin the year. After being recalled by the Stars, he made his NHL debut in a 4–3 victory over the Arizona Coyotes on 11 November 2014. Klingberg scored his first NHL goal on 20 November 2014, against Mike Smith of the Arizona Coyotes. Klingberg finished first in points among all rookie defenceman in 2014–15 and was named to the NHL all-rookie team.

The Stars qualified for the 2016 Stanley Cup playoffs. They defeated the Minnesota Wild in the first-round before falling to the St. Louis Blues in the second. Overall, Klingberg recorded one goal and three assists in 13 games.

After ranking first among NHL defencemen, Klingberg was named to the 2018 NHL All-Star Game, along with teammate Tyler Seguin. He finished the year with a career-high 67 points in 82 games.

On 9 November 2018, Klingberg underwent hand surgery, sidelining him for at least four weeks. He returned on 20 December in a 5–2 loss to the Chicago Blackhawks. Despite missing a total of 18 games, Klingberg recorded ten goals and 45 points.

During the Stars' first-round match-up against the Nashville Predators in the 2019 Stanley Cup playoffs, Klingberg scored the series-winning overtime goal in game six to advance.

On 29 July 2022, as a free agent from the Stars, Klingberg signed a one-year, $7 million contract with the Anaheim Ducks. In the 2022–23 season, Klingberg was leant upon heavily for the rebuilding Ducks, and struggled to match his career scoring pace however still led the Anaheim blueline with eight goals and 24 points in 50 games approaching the NHL trade deadline. On 3 March 2023, as an expiring contract, Klingberg was dealt by the Ducks to the Minnesota Wild in exchange for Andrej Šustr, the rights to prospect Nikita Nesterenko and a 2025 fourth-round draft pick.

Personal life
Klingberg was born in Gothenburg, Sweden, to Anders Klingberg. His father, Anders, is also active in hockey and was a head coach for Göteborg during TV-pucken, a Swedish ice hockey tournament. Klingberg also has two brothers, both of whom are active hockey players; Carl who currently plays for EV Zug of the National League (NL) and Olle, who currently plays with Lerums BK.

Career statistics

Regular season and playoffs

International

Awards and achievements

References

External links
 

1992 births
Living people
Anaheim Ducks players
Borås HC players
Dallas Stars draft picks
Dallas Stars players
Frölunda HC players
Ice hockey people from Gothenburg
Jokerit players
Kiekko-Vantaa players
Minnesota Wild players
National Hockey League All-Stars
People from Lerum Municipality
Skellefteå AIK players
Swedish expatriate ice hockey players in Finland
Swedish expatriate ice hockey players in the United States
Swedish ice hockey defencemen
Texas Stars players